Chesty: A Tribute to a Legend is a documentary directed by John Ford and narrated by John Wayne.  It was filmed in 1970, but not released until 1976, three years after Ford's death.

It was the final film directed by John Ford.

Overview
Documentary about United States Marine General Lewis B. "Chesty" Puller.

References

External links
 

1976 films
1970s English-language films
American documentary films
Documentary films about war
Films about the United States Marine Corps
Films directed by John Ford
1970s American films